The flag and emblem of Selangor are state symbols of Selangor, Malaysia. These two symbols are distinct from each other in style. Similar to other states of Malaysia with Malay royalties, both the flag and arms of Selangor are influenced by royalties, Islam, and political symbols of the state.

Flag

The flag of Selangor consists of four proportionally-sized sections. The upper left and lower right sections are red, while the upper right and lower left sections are yellow. The red sections symbolise bravery. The yellow sections refer to royalty, represented by the local monarchy of Selangor, and the Sultan, who is the head of the state. The official religion of Selangor is Islam, and that is denoted by the white crescent and star on the top left corner of the flag. This flag has an official ratio of 1:2, although the flag is also manufactured in 2:3 proportions with 4x6 and 6x9 foot flags being common.

The flag's design has been in use by the state government with few changes decades before Malaya's independence, the only noticeable differences of earlier iterations being the use of yellow instead of white for the crescent and star. The present flag design was adopted on 30 January 1965.

Emblem

The emblem of Selangor is a symbol of the state; it cannot properly be called a coat of arms as it does not respect heraldic traditions. It is an amalgam of items that represent courage and royalty. The crescent moon and star in the centre represent Islam. The red spear (tombak) in the centre is called the Sambu Warna. The emblem is supported by a short kris (keris pendek) on the right and a long kris (keris panjang) on the left. These weapons constitute the royal regalia of the state. The motto of the state is written in the Jawi script in red, and it reads Dipelihara Allah or "Under the Protection of Allah". A broad belt (tali bengkung) appears underneath the motto. It was worn by local warriors of the past to secure their waistcloth. The emblem was designed and first illustrated by the fifth Sultan of Selangor, Sultan Alauddin Sulaiman Shah.

City, district and municipal coat of arms and flags
While Selangor has not followed the practice of Kelantan, Terengganu and Johor in assigning coat of arms and flags for its cities, districts and municipal areas, some local government authorities in the state have adopted their own coat of arms and flags. An example is the coat of arms and flag of Subang Jaya shown below.

Shah Alam (the state capital), as well as Kajang, Petaling Jaya, Kuala Selangor and Selayang have also adopted their coat of arms and flags.

Coat of Arms

District flags

City flags

References

External links
 Selangor (Malaysia)
 My Far East - Selangor

Selangor
Flags of Malaysia
Malaysian coats of arms
Coats of arms of country subdivisions
Coats of arms with the star and crescent
Coats of arms with spears
Coats of arms with knives